The 2019 Gent–Wevelgem is a road cycling one-day race that took place on 31 March 2019 in Belgium. It was the 81st edition of Gent–Wevelgem and the 12th event of the 2019 UCI World Tour. It was won by Alexander Kristoff in the sprint.

Result

References

Gent-Wevelgem
Gent-Wevelgem
Gent-Wevelgem
Gent–Wevelgem